Stein's lemma, named in honor of Charles Stein, is a theorem of probability theory that is of interest primarily because of its applications to statistical inference — in particular, to James–Stein estimation and empirical Bayes methods — and its applications to portfolio choice theory. The theorem gives a formula for the covariance of one random variable with the value of a function of another, when the two random variables are jointly normally distributed.

Statement of the lemma
Suppose X is a normally distributed random variable with expectation μ and variance σ2. 
Further suppose g is a function for which the two expectations E(g(X) (X − μ)) and E(g ′(X)) both exist. 
(The existence of the expectation of any random variable is equivalent to the finiteness of the expectation of its absolute value.) 
Then

In general, suppose X and Y are jointly normally distributed. Then

Proof

The univariate probability density function for the univariate normal distribution with expectation 0 and variance 1 is

Since  we get from integration by parts:

.

The case of general variance  follows by substitution.

More general statement
Suppose X is in an exponential family, that is, X has the density

Then 

The derivation is same as the special case, namely, integration by parts.

If we only know  has support  , then it could be the case that  but . One such example could be adapted from  so that  is smooth. 

Extensions to elliptically-contoured distributions also exist.

See also

Stein's method
Taylor expansions for the moments of functions of random variables
Stein discrepancy

References

Theorems in statistics
Probability theorems